Paradise Theatre is the tenth studio album by American rock band Styx, released on January 16, 1981, by A&M Records. It was the band's most commercially successful album, peaking at #1 for 3 weeks on the Billboard 200 in April and May 1981 (non-consecutively). It was also the band's fourth consecutive album to be certified triple-platinum by the RIAA.

Four singles from the album charted on various charts, with two songs reaching the top 10 pop singles chart. The lead single "The Best of Times", written by Dennis DeYoung, went to #3 on the Billboard Hot 100. "Too Much Time on My Hands", written by Tommy Shaw, went to #9 on the Billboard Hot 100, Shaw's only top 10 hit for Styx. "Nothing Ever Goes as Planned", written by DeYoung, went to #54 on the US Pop Chart. "Rockin' the Paradise"—written by DeYoung, Shaw and James Young—went to #8 on the Top Rock Track Chart.

Background
A concept album, the album is a fictional account of Chicago's Paradise Theatre from its opening in 1928 to its closing in 1958 (and eventual abandonment), used as a metaphor for America's changing times from the late 1970s into the 1980s. (Dennis DeYoung, who envisioned and developed the entire concept, confirmed this in an episode of In the Studio with Redbeard about the making of the album.)  

DeYoung has said that the theme of the album is "one of hope and renewal in the spirit of the American people to understand the problems that confront the world and this country and find solutions themselves to those problems. Don't depend on heroes to do what you must do for yourself. If you hate your job but you have a dream, then pursue it. Just don't sit around and complain about it."

Newsday critic Wayne Robins stated that the songs "deal with people out of sync with themselves and their environment."  For example, "Too Much Time on My Hands" is about a man who is unemployed and has given up, he regards "Lonely People" as a "contemporary rewrite of  the Beatles' 'Eleanor Rigby,'" and "Nothing Ever Goes as Planned" is about "the inevitability of failure."

Vinyl edition
Initial vinyl copies of the album have a design featuring the name of the band laser etched directly onto the vinyl on side 2 (some copies had a wax design of the cover art). The vinyl record sleeve was a gate-fold and was painted by the artist Chris Hopkins. On the back cover, label and spine, the title of the record is spelled "Paradise Theater", while on the front cover, the title is spelled "Paradise Theatre".

Vinyl releases and initial CD pressings of the album had the musical segue between "Half-Penny, Two-Penny" and "A.D. 1958" indexed as the intro to "A.D. 1958". Subsequent pressings of the CD had the segue indexed as the fade to "Half-Penny, Two-Penny" instead.

Track listing

Personnel

Styx 
 Dennis DeYoung – vocals, keyboards
 James "JY" Young – vocals, electric guitars
 Tommy Shaw – vocals, electric guitars, acoustic guitars, vocoder
 Chuck Panozzo – bass guitar, bass pedals
 John Panozzo – drums, percussion

Additional personnel 
 Steve Eisen – saxophone solos
 Bill Simpson – saxophones
 Mike Halpin – trombone
 John Haynor – trombone
 Dan Barber – trumpet
 Mark Ohlson – trumpet, flugelhorn
 Ed Tossing – horn arrangements

Production 
 Styx – producers, arrangements 
 Rob Kingsland – engineer 
 Gary Loizzo – engineer 
 Will Rascoti – assistant engineer 
 Ted Jensen – mastering at Sterling Sound, NYC
 Dennis DeYoung – original concept 
 Jeffrey Kent Ayeroff – art direction, design 
 George Beeson – art direction, design 
 Chris Hopkins – illustrations
 Marc Hauser – photography 
 Greg Murry – photography
 John Weizenbach – photography

Charts
Album

Singles - Billboard (United States)

References

External links
 Styx - Paradise Theatre (1981) album for sale at Amazon.com
 Styx - Paradise Theatre (1981) album review by Eduardo Rivadavia, credits & releases at AllMusic.com
 Styx - Paradise Theatre (1981) album releases & credits at Discogs.com
 Styx - Paradise Theatre (1981) album credits & user reviews at ProgArchives.com
 Styx - Paradise Theatre (1981) album to be listened as stream at Spotify.com

1981 albums
A&M Records albums
Concept albums
Styx (band) albums